The Lenovo ThinkPad X300 is a discontinued laptop from the ThinkPad line that was manufactured by Lenovo.

References

External links 
 Thinkwiki.org - X300

Lenovo laptops
ThinkPad